Boffin is a British slang term for a scientist. It may also refer to:

Boffins, an Australian children's television series.
Boffin (computer game), computer platform game for the Acorn Electron and BBC Micro systems
Boffin, nickname given by the Royal Navy during World War II to the Mark V mountings for the Oerlikon 20 mm cannons up-gunned with the Bofors 40 mm gun
Boffin, variant spelling of the Welsh family name Baughan

People:
Danny Boffin, Belgian former football player
Ruud Boffin, Belgian goalkeeper, currently playing for West Ham United
Henri M. J. Boffin, Belgian astronomer